Victor N'Dip Akem (born 18 August 1967) is a retired Cameroonian football player. Among the clubs he played for included Canon Yaoundé and Olympic Mvolyé. He also participated at the 1990 FIFA World Cup and 1994 FIFA World Cup.

References

1967 births
Living people
Footballers from Yaoundé
Cameroonian footballers
Cameroon international footballers
1990 FIFA World Cup players
1994 FIFA World Cup players
1986 African Cup of Nations players
1988 African Cup of Nations players
1992 African Cup of Nations players
Canon Yaoundé players
Olympic Mvolyé players
Association football central defenders
Africa Cup of Nations-winning players